Boulanger is a typical French and Francophone surname, equivalent of the English Baker, the Italian Panettiere, etc.

It is shared by several notable persons:

André Boulanger (1886–1958), French professor of literature and Latin scholar
Daniel Boulanger (born 1922), French novelist, playwright, poet and screenwriter
Ernest Boulanger (composer) (1815–1900), French composer and conductor, father of Nadia and Lili
Ernest Boulanger (politician) (1831–1907), French politician and economist
Georges Ernest Boulanger (1837–1891), French general and politician
Georges Boulanger (violinist) (1893–1958), Romanian violinist, conductor and composer
Graciela Rodo Boulanger (born 1935), Bolivian painter
Gustave Boulanger (1824–1888), French painter
Lili Boulanger (1893–1918), French composer, Nadia's sister
Louis Boulanger (1806–1867), French Romantic painter, pastellist, lithographer and poet
Mike Boulanger (born 1949), American baseball coach
Mousse Boulanger (1926-2023), Swiss poet and actress
Nadia Boulanger (1887–1979), French composer, Lili's sister
Nicolas Antoine Boulanger (1722–1759), French writer of the Age of Enlightenment
Pierre Boulanger (born 1987), French actor
Pierre-Jules Boulanger (1885–1950), French engineer and businessman
Richard Boulanger (born 1956), American composer and professor

See also 
 Boulenger
 Boulangerite, mineral
 Bolinger
 Bollinger

French-language surnames
Occupational surnames